Queen of the West may refer to:

Queen Mother of the West, goddess in Chinese mythology
USS Queen of the West (1854), sidewheel steamer
Queen of the West (ship), 1995 sternwheeler